Serine/threonine-protein kinase PAK 4 is an enzyme that in humans is encoded by the PAK4 gene.

PAK4 is one of six members of the PAK family of serine/threonine kinases which are divided into group I (PAK1, PAK2 and PAK3) and group II (PAK4, PAK6 and PAK5/7). PAK4 localizes in sub-cellular domains of the cytoplasm and nucleus. PAK4 regulates cytoskeleton remodeling, phenotypic signaling and gene expression, and affects directional motility, invasion, metastasis, and growth. Similar to PAK1, PAK4-signaling-dependent cellular functions also regulate both physiologic and disease processes such as cancer, as PAK4 is overexpressed and/or hyperstimulated in human cancer, at-large.

Discovery 
PAK4, the founding member of Group II PAK member, was cloned and identified by Minden A. and colleagues in 1998 using a PCR-based strategy from a cDNA library prepared from Jurkett cells.

Gene and spliced variants 
The group II PAKs have less coding exons compared with group I PAKs, highlights the potential structural and functional differences between two group of PAKs. The human PAK4 is about 57-kb in length with 13 exons. The PAK4 generates 12 transcripts of which 10 coding transcripts are predicted to code proteins of about 438 to 591 amino acids long, while remaining two transcripts are non-coding in nature. In contrast to human PAK4, murine PAK4 contains four transcripts - two coding for 593 amino acids long polypeptides and two are non-coding RNA transcripts.

Protein domains 
The core domains of PAK4 include, a kinase domain in the C-terminal region, a p21-binding domain (PBD), and a newly defined auto-inhibitory domain (AID)  or an AID-like pseudosubstrate sequence (PS) domain.

Regulation 

PAK4 activity is stimulated by upstream activators and signals, including by HGF,  PKD, PKA, CDK5RAP3, and SH3RF2.

In addition to other mechanisms, PAK4 functions are mediated though phosphorylation of its effector proteins, including, LIMK1-Thr508, integrin β5-Ser759/Ser762, p120-catenin-Ser288, superior cervical ganglia 10 (SCG10)-Ser50, GEF-H1-Ser810 β-catenin-Ser675, and Smad2-Ser465.

PAK4 and/or PAK4-dependent signals also modulate the expression of genomic targets, including MT1-MMP and p57Kip2.

Inhibitors 
The PAK4 activity and expression has been shown to be inhibited by chemical inhibitors such as PF-3758309, LCH-7749944, glaucarubinone, KY-04031, KY-04045, 1-phenanthryl-tetrahydroisoquinoline derivatives, (-)-β-hydrastine, Inka1, GL-1196, GNE-2861, and microRNAs such as miR-145, miR-433, and miR-126.

Function 

PAK proteins, a family of serine/threonine p21-activating kinases, include PAK1, PAK2, PAK3 and PAK4. PAK proteins are critical effectors that link Rho GTPases to cytoskeleton reorganization and nuclear signaling. They serve as targets for the small GTP binding proteins Cdc42 and Rac and have been implicated in a wide range of biological activities. PAK4 interacts specifically with the GTP-bound form of Cdc42Hs and weakly activates the JNK family of MAP kinases. PAK4 is a mediator of filopodia formation and may play a role in the reorganization of the actin cytoskeleton. Multiple alternatively spliced transcript variants encoding distinct isoforms have been found for this gene. PAK4 has been shown to be repressed at translational level by miR-24.

PAK4 regulates cellular processes by its scaffolding activity and/or by phosphorylation of effector substrates, which in-turn, set-up a cascades of biochemical events cumulating into a cellular phenotypic response. Examples of PAK4-regulated cellular processes include, dynamic reorganization of actin, and microtubule fibers, anchorage-independent growth, filopodium formation, and cell motility</ref>
 ITGB5, cell survival embryonic development, supports stem cell-like phenotypes, and gene expression. Modulation of PAK4 signaling has been shown to lead to significant functional implications in a number of disease conditions, exemplified by oncogenesis, cancer cell invasion and metastasis.

Interactions 

PAK4 has been shown to interact with:
 CDC42,
 ITGB5, and
 LIMK1.

Notes

References

External links 
PAK4 Info with links in the Cell Migration Gateway